Kocagöl can refer to the following villages in Turkey:

 Kocagöl, Hocalar
 Kocagöl, Manyas